The 2016–17 Rugby Europe Trophy is the second-level rugby union competition below the premier Championship. It is the inaugural Trophy competition under its new format, that will see Moldova, Netherlands, Poland, Portugal, Switzerland and Ukraine compete for the title, and a place in the Championship-Trophy promotion play-off.

This years competition sees Portugal drop down out of the top six, outside the Rugby Europe Championship, replacing Belgium who earned Promotion to the Championship for 2017.

Table

Fixtures

Statistics

Top points scorers

Top try scorers

See also 
 Rugby Europe International Championships
 2016–17 Rugby Europe International Championships
 Six Nations Championship
 Antim Cup

References

External links
 FIRA-AER official website

2016–17 Rugby Europe International Championships
2016-17